Ralph Wenz Field  is a town-owned public-use airport located five nautical miles (9 km) southeast of the central business district of the town of Pinedale in Sublette County, Wyoming, United States.

Although most U.S. airports use the same three-letter location identifier for the FAA and IATA, this airport is assigned PNA by the FAA but has no designation from the IATA (which assigned PNA to Pamplona Airport in Pamplona, Spain).

Ralph Wenz Field is named after Staff Sgt. Ralph Wenz of the United States Army Air Corps. Originally from Nebraska, Wenz moved to Wyoming before the war where he learned to fly airplanes, worked as an air mail pilot, and built airfields. He joined the military and became a radio operator with the Engineers Air Corps Division. He died in 1943 when his aircraft, a B-24, crashed in the Alaska wilderness in what would become the Yukon-Charley Rivers National Preserve. His remains were found by a recovery team in October 1944.

Facilities and aircraft 
It has one asphalt paved runway designated 11/29 which measures 7,100 by 100 feet (2,164 x 30 m). For the 12-month period ending May 31, 2019, the airport had 3,995 aircraft operations, an average of 11 per day: 65% general aviation, 34% air taxi, <1% military.

References

External links 
 

Airports in Wyoming
Buildings and structures in Sublette County, Wyoming
Transportation in Sublette County, Wyoming